Acanthodica is a genus of moths of the family Noctuidae. The genus was erected by William Schaus in 1894.

Species
 Acanthodica albiplena Prout, 1919
 Acanthodica cabra Dognin, 1894
 Acanthodica chiripa Dognin, 1894
 Acanthodica coelebs Prout, 1919
 Acanthodica daunus (Druce, 1894)
 Acanthodica drucei (Dognin, 1889)
 Acanthodica emittens (Walker, 1857)
 Acanthodica fassli Zerny, 1916
 Acanthodica fosteri Hampson, 1913
 Acanthodica frigida E. D. Jones, 1921
 Acanthodica grandis Schaus, 1894
 Acanthodica hages Druce, 1900
 Acanthodica lignaris Schaus, 1894
 Acanthodica penicillum Felder & Rogenhofer, 1874
 Acanthodica sinuilinea Prout, 1919
 Acanthodica splendens (Druce, 1889)
 Acanthodica xylinoides Schaus, 1894

References

Catocalini
Noctuoidea genera